Paplaj Mata Mandir is a  temple of the goddess Paplaj Mata in Village Ghata Lalsot sub-district of Dausa District. The temple is situated 35 km from Dausa and about 25 km from Lalsot.

Dausa district
Shakti Peethas